Klaudia Pielesz (born 25 October 1988) is a Polish handball player for Zagłębie Lubin and the Polish national team.

References

1988 births
Living people
Polish female handball players
People from Jastrzębie-Zdrój
Sportspeople from Silesian Voivodeship
21st-century Polish women